Carex oligosperma, common name fewseed sedge, few-seeded sedge, and few-fruited sedge, is a perennial plant in the Carex genus. A distinct variety, Carex oligosperma var. oligosperma, exists.

Conservation status
It is a species of special concern and believed extirpated in Connecticut, It is endangered in Illinois, Massachusetts, and North Carolina, and threatened in Ohio and Pennsylvania.

Native American ethnobotany
The Iroquois take a compound decoction of the plant as an emetic before running or playing lacrosse.

References

oligosperma
Flora of North America
Plants used in traditional Native American medicine